Elga Mark-Kurik (before 1964 Elga Mark; 26 December 1928 Tartu – 2016) was an Estonian geologist and paleontologist.

She described the following taxa:
 Dolganosteus Mark-Kurik, 2010
 Dolganosteus remotus Mark-Kurik, 2010

References

1928 births
2016 deaths
Estonian paleontologists